The Diocese of Chiron or Diocese of Chersonissos (Latin: Dioecesis Chersonesus) was a Roman Catholic diocese located in the town of Chersonissos in the north of Crete, bordering the Aegean Sea. In 1787, it was suppressed and became a Titular Episcopal See.

History
1230?: Established as Diocese of Chiron (or Chersonissos) 
1787: Suppressed as Titular Episcopal See of Chersonesus 
1933: Renamed as Titular Episcopal See of Chersonesus in Creta

Ordinaries

Diocese of Chiron

See also
Catholic Church in Greece

References

Former Roman Catholic dioceses in Greece
Roman Catholic dioceses established in the 13th century
Kingdom of Candia